The Pancholi are a gotra of the Ahir caste found in the state of Gujarat, India.

Origin
The Pancholi is one of the endogamous division of Ahirs. The community is believed to have derived its name from the Panchal region in Saurashtra, their original homeland. According to their traditions, they migrated from Mathura along with Lord Krishna to the Parathar region of Saurashtra. They are distributed over eighteen villages in the Saurashtra region. The community are found mainly in Junagadh, Amreli and Bhavnagar Districts.

It would not be correct to ascribe Pancholi Brahmins in North Gujarat to Panchal region of Gujarat. They belong to other northern states. They migrated to Gujarat on request of the king Mulraj Solanki for performing Rudra Yagya in Siddhapur-Patan in the year 942 AD. All the resettled Brahmins are known as 'Audhichya' and Pancholis are from among the Audichya Brahmins.

Present circumstances
The Pancholi community is Gujarati speaking. It consist of forty four clans, the main ones being the Baldaniya, Bambhaniya, Sisara, Kalsariya, Pardava, Kalosoriys, Katariya, Dhola, Vania, Vaghamashi, Kasad, Vasoyo, Jholandra, Nakum, Hadiya, Dolar, Vekariya, etc. Each of the clans are of equal status and intermarry. Like neighbouring Hindu communities, the community are endogamous and practice clan exogamy.  The Pancholi are a community of small and medium-sized farmers, and grow sorghum, ground nuts and during the monsoon season grow wheat, sugarcane and cotton. A small number have moved to Surat and Mumbai, where they are employed in the diamond, textile and Building industry.

Notable
 Aditya Pancholi, Bollywood film actor
 Suraj Pancholi, Bollywood film actor son of Aditya Pancholi.
  Dalsukh Pancholi, the famous film maker of undivided India.
 Manubhai Pancholi, 'Darshak' The learned academician and writer.

References

Ahir
Social groups of Gujarat